Operation Épaulard 1 (Operation Orca 1) was a military operation undertaken on the behalf of the 2nd Foreign Parachute Regiment to land soldiers in Beirut, Lebanon on 21 August 1982, during the Lebanese Civil War.

They were part of the Multinational Force in Lebanon, a multinational force including United States Armed Forces, Italian Armed Forces and British Armed Forces, which aimed to intervene in the widening conflict in Lebanon and protect French assets and civilians.

See also 
31st Brigade (France)
Foreign Legion Groupment 
List of French paratrooper units

References

Further reading 
 

1982 Lebanon War
French Foreign Legion
Military operations involving France